Escondido High School (EHS) is one of three high schools in the Escondido Union High School District located in Escondido, California. Escondido High received a California Distinguished School award in 2007.

History

The first building to house Escondido High School was located in downtown Escondido. The University of Southern California (USC) constructed it in 1889 for use as a Methodist seminary. The seminary operated for ten years but eventually closed due to lack of finances. USC donated the building to a man named Henry Putnam, who himself gave it to the Escondido Union High School District. Overcrowding prompted the construction of a three-story building just south of the original site; this new building opened in 1927. The original building burned down in 1929.

The severe damage to many school buildings in the 1933 Long Beach earthquake prompted the California State Legislature to pass the Field Act, mandating that school buildings be earthquake-resistant. The state inspected EHS and found the campus to be unsafe, but the inspection report was never acted upon. In the 1950s, the district wanted to construct a new high school to address overcrowding. The new school was to be named Vallecitos High School and located at the present-day North Broadway site. Two bond measures were required to fund construction. When the district began the process of submitting the second bond measure, the state confronted them with the old inspection report. The state again declared the campus unsafe and then required the district to vacate EHS before attempting the bond measure. Classes were moved to the partially completed Vallecitos High, temporary tents, and the buildings at EHS that were still considered safe. The North Broadway campus was completed in 1954. The Vallecitos name was dropped and the campus took the Escondido High name. The downtown campus was fully demolished in the mid-1980s.

Stats 
Grade Range: 9-12
Number of Academic Counselors: 6
Stadium: Wilson Stadium
Baseball Field: Pete Coscarart Field

Sports 
Year-Round
Sideline Cheerleading

Fall
Boys/Girls Cross Country
Girls Field Hockey
Football
Girls Golf
Girls Tennis
Girls Volleyball
Boys Water Polo

Winter
CIF Cheerleading
Boys Basketball
Girls Basketball
Boys Soccer
Girls Soccer
Girls Water Polo
Wrestling

Spring
Baseball
Boys Golf
Softball
Girls/Boys Swimming
Boys Tennis
Girls/Boys Track and Field
Boys Volleyball

Faces of Death film 
In the 1980s, Bart Schwartz a lecturer showed the Faces of Death film to students in the school. Two students, Diane Geese and Sherry Forget claimed that they suffered too much trauma and later sued the school; they were compensated. The Bart was suspended but not fired.

October 2007 wildfires 
During the California wildfires of October 2007, Escondido High School was an emergency shelter for evacuees, along with Mission Hills High School, Mission Hills Church, and Calvin Christian School.

Notable alumni
 Pete Coscarart, first Major League Baseball player signed out of San Diego State University in California
 Mike Frank, Major League Baseball outfielder
Dashon Johnson, professional boxer/ MMA
Randy Johnson, Major League infielder and Minor League field coordinator for the San Diego Padres
 John Mallinger, professional golfer
 Mark Redman, All-Star Major League Baseball pitcher and member of the 2003 World Series Champion Florida Marlins
Mark Wiebe, professional golfer

See also
List of high schools in San Diego County, California

References

External links
Website of Escondido High School
Escondido Union School District
Escondido Unified High School District

High schools in San Diego County, California
Educational institutions established in 1894
Public high schools in California
Education in Escondido, California
1894 establishments in California